Pseudostegophilus is a genus of pencil catfishes native to rivers in tropical South America. The members of this genus are obligate parasites that feed on scales and mucus of other fish.

Species
There are currently two recognized species in this genus:
 Pseudostegophilus haemomyzon (Myers, 1942)
 Pseudostegophilus nemurus (Günther, 1869)

P. haemomyzon originates from the Orinoco River basin in Venezuela while P. nemurus is found in the Amazon basin in Brazil and Peru. P. haemomyzon grows to about 5.7 centimetres (2.2 in) SL. P. nemurus grows to about  TL. P. nemurus is said to become attached to the gills, anal region, and fins of dead, dying, or disabled fishes.

References

Trichomycteridae
Fish of South America
Fish of the Amazon basin
Fish of Brazil
Fish of Peru
Fish of Venezuela
Freshwater fish genera
Catfish genera
Taxa named by Carl H. Eigenmann
Taxa named by Rosa Smith Eigenmann